The women's U23 individual time trial at the 2008 European Road Championships took place on 3 July. The championships were hosted by the Italian city of Pettenasco. The course was 28.1 km long, started in Pettenasco and finished in Stresa.

Dutchwoman Ellen van Dijk won the time trial. Van Dijk completed the 25-kilometre course in a time of 32:33, beating Svitlana Halyuk and Lesya Kalytovska, both from Ukraine.

Final classification

References

2008 European Road Championships
European Road Championships – Women's U23 time trial
2008 in women's road cycling